4-Cyano-4'-pentylbiphenyl is a commonly used nematic liquid crystal with the chemical formula C18H19N. It frequently goes by the common name 5CB. 5CB was first synthesized by George William Gray, Ken Harrison, and J.A. Nash at the University of Hull in 1972 and at the time it was the first member of the cyanobiphenyls. The liquid crystal was discovered after Gray's group received a grant from the UK Ministry of Defence to find a liquid crystal that had liquid crystal phases near room temperature with the specific intention of using them in liquid crystal displays. The molecule is about 20 Å long. The liquid crystal 5CB undergoes a phase transition from a crystalline state to a nematic state at 22.5 °C and it goes from a nematic to an isotropic state at 35.0 °C.

Production
5CB is produced by modifying biphenyl in a linear manner. First Br2 is added to the biphenyl to introduce a bromine atom to the end of the moiety. Next aluminium chloride and C4H9COCl is added to the sample, followed by the addition of potassium hydroxide and NH2NH2. By this point the molecule will have a bromine atom on one end of the rigid core and C5H11 on the other end. Finally, introduction of copper(I) cyanide and DMF results in the removal of the bromine and its replacement with CN, yielding 5CB.

References

Further reading

External links 
Space Filling Model of 5CB
 

Liquid crystals
Liquid crystal displays
Nitriles